The Scottish Café was a café in Lwów, Poland (now Lviv, Ukraine) where, in the 1930s and 1940s, mathematicians from the  Lwów School of Mathematics collaboratively discussed research problems, particularly in functional analysis and topology.

Stanisław Ulam recounts that the tables of the café had marble tops, so they could write in pencil, directly on the table, during their discussions. To keep the results from being lost, and after becoming annoyed with their writing directly on the table tops, Stefan Banach's wife provided the mathematicians with a large notebook, which was used for writing the problems and answers and eventually became known as the Scottish Book. The book—a collection of solved, unsolved, and even probably unsolvable problems—could be borrowed by any of the guests of the café. Solving any of the problems was rewarded with prizes, with the most difficult and challenging problems having expensive prizes (during the Great Depression and on the eve of World War II), such as a bottle of fine brandy.

For problem 153, which was later recognized as being closely related to Stefan Banach's "basis problem", Stanisław Mazur offered the prize of a live goose. This problem was solved only in 1972 by Per Enflo, who was presented with the live goose in a ceremony that was broadcast throughout Poland.

The café building now houses the Szkocka Restaurant & Bar (named for the original Scottish Café) and the Atlas Deluxe hotel at the street address of 27 Taras Shevchenko Prospekt.

See also
The following mathematicians were associated with the Lwów School of Mathematics or contributed to The Scottish Book:
 Stefan Banach
 Karol Borsuk
 Mark Kac
 Stefan Kaczmarz
 Bronisław Knaster
 Kazimierz Kuratowski
 Stanisław Saks
 Juliusz Schauder
 Hugo Steinhaus
 Stanisław Ulam
 Gus Ward

References

External links
 Scottish book
 Scottish book Web page at Home Page of Stefan Banach at Adam Mickiewicz University in Poznań website
 Manuscript of Scottish book (PDF)
 Typescript of English version of Scottish book (PDF)
 Kawiarnia Szkocka at the MacTutor archive
 Sheldon Axler's review of "The Life of Stefan Banach"

History of Lviv
History of mathematics
History of education in Poland
Coffeehouses and cafés in Poland
Buildings and structures in Lviv
Poland–Scotland relations